Henry Cooper Smith (August 3, 1862 – May 15, 1932) was a justice of the Montana Supreme Court from 1907 to 1913.

Born in Fond du Lac County, Wisconsin, Smith read law with the firms of Sale & Pierce and Norcross & Dinwiddie before gaining admission to the Wisconsin Bar in 1885. He moved to Helena, Montana, in 1888 and began practicing law. Smith was elected as a district judge to the First Judicial District in 1896, and in 1906, he was elected an associate justice of the Montana Supreme Court, serving from 1907 until his term expired in 1913, when he went back to practicing law. He campaigned for in the 1912 Senate election, but was unsuccessful.

Smith was married and had three sons. He died in Helena, Montana at the age of 69.

References

Justices of the Montana Supreme Court
People from Fond du Lac County, Wisconsin
Politicians from Helena, Montana
Wisconsin lawyers
1862 births
1932 deaths